Marching in Darkness is a 1996 drama film directed by Massimo Spano.

Plot

The recruit Saro Franzese befriends the sergeant of his squad, Gianni Tricarico, who immediately becomes infatuated with him. The soldier does not welcome or understand his advances, and, after a lively evening at a disco, criticizes the ambiguous and aggressive behavior of his friend. They leave together in Gianni's car, apparently intending to go back to their barracks, but Gianni drives to a road frequented by transsexuals, many of whom he seems to know well. Saro is not interested in the scene and leaves the car, whereupon he accepts a ride in another car with apparently only the driver on board. But Saro comes back soon after being beaten for trying to defend himself and after being raped by the driver.

Saro, wounded and distraught, roams around until he is picked up by Gianni, who, after learning that Captain Silvio Roatta, the commander of their battalion, was one of Saro's attackers, brings him to the hospital of their barracks with the intention to hide what happened; but a day later, a doctor tells him that the soldier cannot stay without official permission and therefore is forced to leave. Gianni then takes Saro to the house of his sister, Paola, where she lives with her husband Mario and their two children. The couple want to know why Saro is in such condition, but Saro refuses to explain and only after a violent outburst does he burst into tears and tell the truth.

Gianni reveals that he has jotted down the licence number of the car that Saro got into on the night of the rape and Saro finds that the licence number is correct. Saro and his sister go to a car showroom, where Saro recognizes the driver: it was Vittorio Scarpa, a sex maniac who is heavily in debt and who because of the aforementioned reasons has a difficult and painful relationship with his wife Gabriella and his son Fabrizio. Once recognized, Scarpa is reported to the police and Gianni's captain subpoenas him to appear as a witness.

Scarpa tells Roatta about the trial, but the captain, who is engaged to Laura, the mayor's daughter, not only already knew about the trial, but also knows the identity of the witness. He reassures Scarpa that the sergeant depends on him; in fact, ever since the moment Gianni arrives, he has been exerting pressure on him and blackmailing him into letting Scarpa continue his life, which means bringing transsexuals into a secret room inside the car showroom where he enjoys his secret pleasures, and also into reporting Saro for slander. After the beginning of the trial process, Paola invites Gianni to dinner to ask for an explanation, but Gianni replies that he is not going to testify against his captain and, when he is left alone with Saro after a heated fight, confesses to being raped when he was thirteen years old and asserts that he will not support him in any case.

The military tribunal has already started the inquiry process and Captain Antonio Marsili is in charge. He first interrogates Saro, who confirms the accusation but is informed that adding to the accusation of slander, he is also subjected to proceedings for retention and for immoral conduct. Later Gianni is called to support the claim that on the night of the alleged rape, he only saw Saro leaving the barracks; after that the captain asks him if there is a relationship between him and Saro, having once seen them "joking" in the barracks. Captain Marsili then informs him of the proceedings that Saro is subjected to; he also summons a carabiniere who is uncertain about the dynamics of the whole incident and tells him that the investigation will still be difficult.

In the meantime, things are not going well in the barracks, either: in fact, Saro is provoked by his fellow soldiers, and Gianni defends him by making him aware of the dangers that run inside the military structure. But the younger man obstinately decides not to drop the charge and even spits in the sergeant's face, whereupon Gianni strikes him by breaking his leg. Marsili visits Saro in the hospital, but the soldier refuses to tell him how the incident happened. When everything seems to work in disfavor for Saro, Scarpa's family unexpectedly offer help: at the hearing, Scarpa's wife bursts into tears, postponing her testimony, while his son breaks his father's alibi by revealing that Scarpa is actually homosexual, addicted to alcohol, and has a violent nature, so that the thirteen hospital admissions of his mother that have come to light are now officially attributed to "domestic incidents". After the hearing, the attitude of Roatta's fiancée, who demands an explanation from him out of suspicion, has also changed, but Roatta punches her with his fist.

Captain Roatta, when he is back in the barracks, talks with Gianni and says that he knows Gianni's attack at Saro was merely a way to turn the younger soldier against him. From that moment onwards, he exerts more pressure on the sergeant, withholding freedom from the platoon and forcing the soldiers to undergo back-breaking night-time drills to turn Gianni's comrades against him. After receiving complaints from Corporal Cau, Roatta states that to make things go back to the way they were, problems will have to be "solved" among themselves. But after meeting with Scarpa, Roatta informs him that if he is left all alone, he will testify against him.

Marsili, in the meantime, continues to collide with Gianni over the sergeant's silence on the subject, threatening to put him on trial as well. Gianni continues to deny the accusation, but reveals that two years before, Roatta's driver, the soldier Granelli, went on leave because of neurasthenia. Once the Captain finishes talking with the younger man, he meets Roatta and tells him that he has taken cognizance of the incident, that it was the sergeant who informed him, and that he will do everything possible to expel him from the army, but Roatta is reassured by the mayor that Saro's lawyer, who is also the mayor's friend, has stepped down from the post, and that, also for an electoral motive, he will support him in spite of his daughter's suspicions.

However, the inquiry continues and Marsili, having been convinced of Roatta's guilt by now, employs a lawyer for Saro. At the same time, Gianni is attacked and stabbed in the shower by three masked soldiers and just then the intervention of Marsili, who is drawn to the scene by Gianni's screams, saves him. Once he is sent to the hospital, Gianni tells Marsili how the attack happened and confesses that he has been behaving angrily towards Saro. The Captain listens to his confession and gets what he needs to incriminate the culprits, but specifies that if Gianni confirms everything, he will be removed from the army. The sergeant consents and, when he is left alone with Saro, apologizes and asks for a kiss.

Scarpa, upon his family's denunciation, is arrested for maltreatment, fraud, and for falsification of accounts, having been heavily indebted to the car dealer. The Captain calls for the remission of Roatta from the army, avoiding in this way the rigidity of the military law, but, disappointed in the high esteem that the officer was placed in, he wishes that the civil law will be inflexible. Marsili, praised by the commander, turns down the promotion nevertheless, remembering Roatta's foreign missions and claiming that he does not want to build his career on the destruction of another officer. At the trial, Gianni confesses everything he has previously confided in the Captain, including the activity of male prostitution. Once he is released, Gianni is greeted by Saro again as his friend; while Roatta, who shows up at the hearing in a camouflage suit, commits suicide with a bayonet before the astonished judge.

Cast
Thomas Kretschmann as Sergeant Gianni Tricarico
Flavio Albanese as Soldier Saro
Jean-Marc Barr as Captain Silvio Roatta
Massimo Dapporto as Vittorio Scarpa
Ottavia Piccolo as Gabriella Scarpa
Nicola Russo as Fabrizio Scarpa
Roberto Citran as Captain Antonio Marsili
Mariella Valentini as Paola Franzese
Emilio Bonucci as Mario
Franco Interlenghi as Mayor
Bruno Corazzari as Colonel
Antonella Fattori as Laura
Giorgio Crisafi as Lawyer
Fabrizio Pioda as Trane
Lorenzo Di Pasqua as Corporal Cau
Gabriella Saitta as Judge
Riccardo Babbi as Soldier Granelli
Mattia Sbragia as Carabiniere
Maximilian Nisi as Luca

Production
Marching in Darkness was the first film produced by Zeudi Araya. The film did not have any collaboration on the part of the Italian Army.

See also

Hazing
Homosexuality
Rape
Coercion

References

External links

1996 films
1990s Italian-language films
1996 drama films
Italian drama films
Italian LGBT-related films
1996 LGBT-related films